TGL may refer to:

Aviation 
 Touch-and-go landing, a flight teaching maneuver.

Computing 
 Technical Group Laboratory, a Japanese game company
 Tiger Lake series Intel CPUs
 Transparent OpenGL, part of OpenGL Multipipe

Sports 
  TGL, a golf league formed in partnership with the PGA Tour that will begin play in January 2024

Other uses 
 The ISO 639 language code for Tagalog language